The PenAgain is an ergonomic writing device developed by Pacific Writing Instruments, Inc.  It was designed to alleviate stress and reduce the risk of repetitive strain injury while writing.

Writing with the PenAgain differs from writing with a traditional cylindrical pen. The writer's index finger sits in the Y-shaped device, so that the weight of the writer's hand directs pressure to the pen’s tip.  This eliminates the need to grip the pen and push the tip into the paper.  The index finger guides the tip of the pen.

History

The bifurcated shape for a writing device was first proposed and patented by John WyttenBach in 1886.  Several other iterations arose including The Pen and Brush Holder of Dwight B. Smith and the Penholder by George Cooper Ward. Colin Roche designed the PenAgain while serving detention in high school. The PenAgain went through several design iterations and on October 28, 2003 was granted a patent from the USPTO.

References

External links
PenAgain — Official Website
PenAgain— Official UK Website
Ergonomic Review of the Ergo Sof PenAgain- Chris Adam, About.com, 2006
Bounds, Gwendolyn:
The Long Road to Wal-Mart Shelves
The Hard Part Follows After Big Chain Says Yes
Pen Maker’s Trial by Wal-Mart, Part III
Pen Maker Struggles with Too Much Demand. Startup Journal
"You Got the Big Break. Now What?". November 13, 2006.  The Wall Street Journal.

Pens